Galera Victoria was a Spanish galleon that sank in 1729 in the Atlantic Ocean off Gijón, Spain, while she was on her maiden voyage.

Construction 
Galera Victoria was launched on 14 February 1729 in Guarnizo, Spain for the Spanish Navy. She was fitted with 40 cannons.

Sinking 
On 27 February 1729, Galera Victoria set of on her maiden voyage when she sank in the Atlantic Ocean off Gijón, Spain under unknown circumstances with an unknown number of crew affected by the sinking.

References

1720s ships
Ships of the line of the Spanish Navy
Age of Sail ships of Spain
Galleons
Maritime incidents in 1729
Ships built in Spain
Shipwrecks in the Atlantic Ocean
Frigates of the Spanish Navy